Jayasimha is a 1987 Indian Kannada-language film,  directed by  P. Vasu and produced by K. C. N. Chandrashekhar and K. C. N. Mohan. The film stars Vishnuvardhan, Mahalakshmi, Vajramuni and N. S. Rao. The film has musical score by Vijay Anand.

Cast

Vishnuvardhan
Mahalakshmi
Vajramuni
N. S. Rao
Umashree
Sudheer
Lohithaswa
Master Amith
Sundar Raj
Babu Singh
Kanchana
Janaki
Chi Ravishankar
Mysore Lokesh
V. R. Bhaskar
Bob Christo
Jayamalini
Disco Shanthi
Shani Mahadevappa
Sridhar
Bemel Somanna
Janardhan

Soundtrack
The music was composed by Vijay Anand.

References

External links
 

1987 films
1980s Kannada-language films
Films directed by P. Vasu
Kannada remakes of Hindi films
Films scored by Vijayanand